The 1959 FIBA European Championship, commonly called FIBA EuroBasket 1959, was the eleventh FIBA EuroBasket regional basketball championship, held by FIBA Europe. The tournament, which was hosted by Turkey, began on 21 May 1959 and concluded with the final on 31 May 1959. Seventeen national teams affiliated with the International Basketball Federation (FIBA) entered the competition. Mithat Paşa Stadium, Istanbul was the location of the event.

The Soviet Union claimed their fifth EuroBasket title, while Czechoslovakia captured the silver, and France the bronze.

Results

First round
In the preliminary round, the 17 teams were split up into four groups. One of the groups had five teams, with the other three having four each. The top two teams in each group advanced to the final round, while the other nine teams were relegated to classification play.

Group A

Group B

Group C

Group D

Classification round 1
The first classification round was played in three round-robin groups. The first place from each group advanced to the second round to define the 9th–11th places, the second from each group, the 12th–14th and the remaining teams, the 14–17th places in the final standings.

Group 1

Group 2

Group 3

Classification round 2

Group 1 (9th–11th Place)

Group 2 (12th–14th Place)

Group 3 (15th–17th Place)

Semi-final round
The Semi-Final round consisted of two round-robin groups, where the top two from each one advanced to the Final Round to decide the first four places in the final standings, and the remaining teams, the 5th–8th places.

Group 1

Group 2

Final round
Two groups of four teams determined the 1st–8th places. Results from matches between teams that shared a group in Semi-Final round were carried over to this round (i.e. Soviet Union vs. Hungary, France vs. Czechoslovakia, etc.).

Group 1 (1st–4th Place)

Group 2 (5th–8th Place)

{{Basketballbox|bg=
|date=30 May 1959 
|time= 16:00 
|teamA= 
|scoreA= 53
|teamB= |scoreB= 52
|H1= 24–28
|H2= 29–24
| points1= Mirchev (10) 
| points2= Novacek (19) 
}}

Final standings

Team rosters1. Soviet Union: Jānis Krūmiņš, Gennadi Volnov, Maigonis Valdmanis, Valdis Muižnieks, Viktor Zubkov, Arkady Bochkarov, Yuri Korneev, Guram Minashvili, Mikhail Semyonov, Aleksandr Petrov, Vladimir Torban, Mikhail Studenetski (Coach: Stepan Spandaryan)2. Czechoslovakia: Jiří Baumruk, František Konvička, Bohumil Tomášek, Miroslav Škeřík, Jaroslav Šíp, Boris Lukášik, Jaroslav Křivý, Dušan Lukášik, Zdeněk Rylich, Jiří Šťastný, Jaroslav Tetiva, Bohuslav Rylich (Coach: Gustáv Herrmann)3. France: Henri Grange, Robert Monclar, Maxime Dorigo, Philippe Baillet, Christian Baltzer, Andre Chavet, Jerome Christ, Jean-Claude Lefebvre, Bernard Mayeur, Michel Rat, Lucien Sedat, Henri Villecourt (Coach: Robert Busnel)4. Hungary: János Greminger, Tibor Zsíros, László Bánhegyi, Tibor Czinkán, László Gabányi, János Simon, János Bencze, Zoltán Judik, Ottó Temesvári, Miklós Boháty, Árpád Glatz, Merényi (Coach: János Páder)9. Yugoslavia:'''  Miodrag Nikolić, Marjan Kandus, Branko Radović, Slobodan Gordić, Igor Jelnikar, Matja Dermastija, Milutin Minja, Ivo Daneu, Nemanja Đurić, Radivoj Korać, Radovan Radović, Boris Kristančič (Coach: Aleksandar Nikolić)

External links
EuroBasket 1959 archive.fiba.com

 
1959
1958–59 in European basketball
Sports competitions in Istanbul
1959 in Turkish sport
1959 EuroBasket
1950s in Istanbul
May 1959 sports events in Europe